David Tiernan Disney (August 25, 1803 – March 14, 1857) was a U.S. Representative from Ohio for three terms from 1849 to 1855. He also served as Speaker of both the Ohio State Senate and the Ohio House of Representatives.

Early life and career 
David Disney was born in Baltimore, Maryland, but moved to Ohio in 1807 where he spent most of his life. After he was admitted to the bar and commenced practice in Cincinnati.

State legislature
He served as member of the Ohio House of Representatives in 1829, 1831, and 1832, serving as speaker for the 1832-33 session. After his last term in the house, he moved over to the Ohio State Senate, where he was immediately elected Speaker of the Senate (the predecessor position to the President of the Senate), in 1833. He was elected for another term in 1834, and would serve two more in 1843 and 1844. He served as delegate to the Democratic National Convention in 1848 where Lewis Cass was nominated for President.

Congress
Disney was elected as a Democrat to the Thirty-first, Thirty-second, and Thirty-third Congresses, and served as chairman of the Committee on Elections (Thirty-second Congress), Committee on Public Lands (Thirty-third Congress). He was an unsuccessful candidate for renomination in 1854.

Death
He died in 1857 in Washington, D.C., March 14, 1857. He was interred in Spring Grove Cemetery, Cincinnati, Ohio.

Sources

1803 births
1857 deaths
Speakers of the Ohio House of Representatives
Presidents of the Ohio State Senate
Democratic Party Ohio state senators
Politicians from Baltimore
Burials at Spring Grove Cemetery
Politicians from Cincinnati
19th-century American politicians
Democratic Party members of the Ohio House of Representatives
Democratic Party members of the United States House of Representatives from Ohio